Aaron Kostner  (born 8 July 1999) is an Italian Nordic combined skier.

He competed at the 2018 Winter Olympics.

References

External links

1999 births
Living people
Italian male Nordic combined skiers
Olympic Nordic combined skiers of Italy
Nordic combined skiers at the 2018 Winter Olympics
Nordic combined skiers at the 2016 Winter Youth Olympics